The 1979–80 season was the 107th season of competitive football in Scotland and the 83rd season of Scottish league football.

Scottish Premier Division

Champions: Aberdeen
Relegated: Dundee, Hibernian

Scottish League First Division

Promoted: Hearts, Airdrieonians
Relegated: Arbroath, Clyde

Scottish League Second Division

Promoted: Falkirk, East Stirlingshire

Cup honours

Other honours

National

County

 – aggregate over two legs – won on penalties

Highland League

Individual honours

Scottish national team

Scotland finished fourth in the 1980 British Home Championship. Scotland won just one game, against Wales; Willie Miller scored Scotland's only goal of the tournament.

Key:
(H) = Home match
(A) = Away match
ECQG2 = European Championship qualifying – Group 2
BHC = British Home Championship

See also

1979–80 Aberdeen F.C. season

References

External links
Scottish Football Historical Archive

 
Seasons in Scottish football